Konrad Krauss is a German actor and well known for his role as family patriarch Arno Brandner on the soap opera Verbotene Liebe (Forbidden Love).

Krauss studied drama and music on the Hochschule für Musik und Theater Hamburg. In 1960, he played angel Raphael in a Faust screening. Krauss was seen in various plays and had many guest appearances in television. His life changed when he joined Verbotene Liebe in 1995.

In 2006, his friend and actor fellow Uwe Friedrichsen made a guest appearance to give Arno new optimism.

External links

1938 births
Living people
German male television actors
German male soap opera actors
People from Wilhelmshaven
German male stage actors